Jennifer Welsh is a Canadian writer, consultant, and professor, specializing in the field of international relations. Welsh has a Bachelor of Arts in Political Science and Economics from the University of Saskatchewan (1987). Welsh was named a Rhodes Scholar (1987) and completed a Master's and Doctorate in International Relations from the University of Oxford (1987-1992). From 1999 to 2014, Welsh was a professor in International Relations at the University of Oxford, where she also co-founded the Oxford Institute for Ethics, Law and Armed Conflict. From 2014 to 2019, Welsh was the chair in International Relations at the European University Institute (Florence), where she directed a five-year European Research Council project on the ethics and law of contemporary armed conflict. Welsh currently works as the Canada 150 Research Chair in Global Governance and Security at McGill University, is the Director of the Centre for International Peace and Security Studies and a co-director of the Canadian Research Network on Women Peace and Security. She is also a professor at the Max Bell School of Public Policy in Montreal, Quebec, and is a frequent commentator in Canadian media on foreign affairs.

Professional Career/Public Service
Welsh was a lecturer in International Relations at the University of Oxford (1999-2006) and was appointed a full professor in 2006.

From 1997 to 1998 Welsh was a Professor and Associate Director of the Peace & Conflict Studies Programme at the University of Toronto. She was a lecturer and Programme Administrator at the Central European University summer school in International Relations (1992)

Welsh has engaged in a number of policy processes related to international peace and security and Canadian foreign policy. In 2005, she was the lead writer for the International Policy Statement for the Government of Canada. From 2013 to 2016 Welsh was served as Assistant Secretary General and Special Advisor to UN Secretary-General Ban Ki-Moon on the Responsibility to Protect – a position in which she helped to further develop and implement the principle within and beyond the UN system.

Welsh currently works as the Canada 150 Research Chair in Global Governance and Security and serves as the Director of the Centre for International Peace and Security Studies (CIPSS) at McGill University. She is also a professor at the Max Bell School of Public Policy, and the Co-Director of the Research Network on Women, Peace and Security.

Welsh has also served as consultant to several organizations including McKinsey and Co, Aspen Institute’s Business and Society Program, and the Government of Canada.

Other Activities and Affiliations 
Welsh is the author of several books including, At Home in the World: Canada's Global Vision for the 21st Century (2004, Harper Collins), The Return of History: Conflict, Migration and Geo-politics in the 21st Century (House of Anansi Press, 2016), and Humanitarian Intervention and International Relations (Oxford University Press, 2004).

Boards 

 (2002-2006) Editorial Board, The Roundtable: Journal of Commonwealth Affairs (journal) 
 (2006-2011) Board of Trustees, Walter and Duncan Gordon Foundation
 (2009-2011) Alberta Premier’s Council on National Issues
 (2009-2015) Editorial Board, Cambridge University Press BISA Series in International Relations
 (2010–present) Editorial Board, Global Responsibility to Protect 
 (2014-2017) Steering Committee, American Academy of Arts and Sciences Project on Ethics, Technology and War 
 (2014–present) Editorial Board, International Journal
 (2011–present Editorial Board, Ethics and International Affairs
 (2013-2016) Special Advisor to Secretary General of the U.N
 (2014–present) Scientific Advisory Board, Peace Research Institute of Frankfurt
 (2016–present) International Advisory Board, Auschwitz Institute for Peace and Reconciliation, New York
 (2016–present) International Advisory Board, Global Centre for the Responsibility to Protect, New York
 (2019–present), Committee on Security, American Academy of Arts and Sciences
 (2019-current) Board of Trustees, Trudeau Foundation
 (2022–present) Editorial Board, Journal of International Political Theory

Awards, Honours, and Recognitions 

 (1987) Governor General's Medal for Most Outstanding Graduate, University of Saskatchewan
 (1987) Rhodes Scholarship (Canada – Prairies) 
 (1990) Doctoral Fellowship - Social Science and Humanities Research Council of Canada 
 (1992-1993) Jean Monnet Research Fellowship, European University Institute (Florence, Italy) 
 (1992) Thesis Prize in International Relations, University of Oxford 
 (1993–94) Cadieux Research Fellow in the Policy Planning Staff of the Canadian Department of Foreign Affairs Cadieux Research Fellow, Policy Planning Staff, Canadian Dept. of Foreign Affairs: Research and policy analysis on Canada's changing role in European security (Ottawa, Canada)
 (2005) Distinguished Visiting Fellow, Massey College (University of Toronto) 
 (2006-2009) Trudeau Foundation Prize Fellowship
 (2016) CBC Massey Lecturer
 (2020) Distinguished Alumni Award, University of Saskatchewan
 (2021) Election as International Honorary Member, American Academy of Arts and Sciences
 (2022) Distinguished Scholar Award, Ethics Section, International Studies Association

Publications 
1995 Author, Edmund Burke and International Relations (Macmillan/St. Martin's Press)
1998 Co author, Chips & Pop: Decoding the Nexus Generation (Malcolm Lester Books)
1999 Co-editor, Empire and Community: Edmund Burke's Writings and Speeches on International Relations (Westview Press)
2003 Editor, Humanitarian Intervention and International Relations (Oxford University Press)
2004 Author, At Home in the World: Canada’s Global Vision for the 21st Century (HarperCollins)
2007 Co-editor, Exporting Good Governance: Temptations and Challenges in Canada’s Aid Program (Wilfrid Laurier University Press)
2008 Co-editor, The United Nations Security Council and War: The Evolution of Thought and Practice since 1945 (Oxford University Press)
2013 Co-editor, Just and Unjust Military Intervention: European Political Thought from Vitoria to Mill (Cambridge University Press)
2015 Co-editor, The Responsibility to Prevent: Overcoming the Challenges of Atrocity Prevention (Oxford University Press
2016 Author, The Return of History: Conflict, Migration, and Geopolitics in the Twenty-First Century (House of Anansi Press Inc.)

References

External links
Oxford Institute for Ethics, Law and Armed Conflict
James Martin 21st Century School

Living people
Canadian Rhodes Scholars
Fellows of Somerville College, Oxford
University of Saskatchewan alumni
Year of birth missing (living people)
Canadian women non-fiction writers
Canadian non-fiction writers
Writers from Regina, Saskatchewan
Responsibility to protect
Canadian officials of the United Nations